Umeshbhai Naranbhai Makwana is an Indian politician, Social worker and philanthropist. He is serving as a Member of the Gujarat Legislative Assembly from the Botad Assembly constituency as a Member of the Aam Aadmi Party since 8 December 2022. Makwana belongs to the Koli caste of Gujarat.

Umesh Makwana was born and brought up in Botad, Gujarat, India to his father Naranbhai Makwana. He has studied BA. He started a primary and secondary school. He distributed over 6 lakh food packets during COVID-19 lockdown in India under his initiative Manavta Seva Rath.

References 

Living people
Aam Aadmi Party politicians
Gujarat MLAs 2022–2027
Year of birth missing (living people)